Severov is a Russian surname. Notable people with the surname include:

 Aleksandr Severov (1889–?), Russian wrestler
 Sergei Severov, Soviet-Russian footballer
 Nikolai Severov, Soviet-Russian architect

Russian-language surnames